Most nonmetallic elements were discovered after the freezing of mercury in 1759 by the German-Russian physicist Braun and the Russian polymath Lomonosov. Before then, carbon, sulfur and antimony were known in antiquity. Arsenic and phosphorus were discovered in the middle ages and in the Renaissance, respectively. In the ensuing century and a half, from 1766 to 1895, all the remaining nonmetallic elements, bar radon had been isolated. The latter three were discovered in 1898.

Antiquity: C, S
Carbon and sulfur were known in antiquity. The earliest known use of charcoal dates to around 3750 BCE. The Egyptians and Sumerians employed it for the reduction of copper, zinc, and tin ores in the manufacture of bronze. Diamonds were probably known from as early as 2500 BCE. The first true chemical analyses were made in the 18th century; Lavoisier recognized carbon as an element in 1789. Sulfur usage dates from before 2500 BCE; it was recognized as an element by Antoine Lavoisier in 1777.

17th century: P
Phosphorus was prepared from urine, by Hennig Brand, in 1669.

18th century: H, O, N, Cl
Hydrogen: Cavendish, in 1766, was the first to distinguish hydrogen from other gases, although Paracelsus around 1500, Robert Boyle (1670), and Joseph Priestley (?) had observed its production by reacting strong acids with metals. Lavoisier named it in 1793. Oxygen: Carl Wilhelm Scheele obtained oxygen by heating mercuric oxide and nitrates in 1771, but did not publish his findings until 1777. Priestley also prepared this new "air" by 1774, but only Lavoisier recognized it as a true element; he named it in 1777. Nitrogen: Rutherford discovered nitrogen while he was studying at the University of Edinburgh. He showed that the air in which animals breathed, after removal of exhaled carbon dioxide, was no longer able to burn a candle. Scheele, Henry Cavendish, and Priestley also studied this element at about the same time; Lavoisier named it in 1775 or 1776.>Chlorine: In 1774, Scheele obtained chlorine from hydrochloric acid but thought it was an oxide. Only in 1808 did Humphry Davy recognize it as an element.

Early 19th century:I, Se, Br
 Iodine was discovered in 1811 by Courtois from the ashes of seaweed. Selenium: In 1817, when Berzelius and Johan Gottlieb Gahn were working with lead they discovered a substance that was similar to tellurium. After more investigation Berzelius concluded that it was a new element, related to sulfur and tellurium. Because tellurium had been named for the Earth, Berzelius named the new element "selenium", after the moon. Bromine: Balard and Gmelin both discovered bromine in the autumn of 1825 and published their results in the following year.

Late 19th century: He, F, Ar, Kr, Ne, Xe
Helium: In 1868, Janssen and Lockyer independently observed a yellow line in the solar spectrum that did not match that of any other element. In 1895, in each case at around the same time, Ramsay, Cleve, and Langlet independently observed helium trapped in cleveite. Fluorine: André-Marie Ampère predicted an element analogous to chlorine obtainable from hydrofluoric acid, and between 1812 and 1886 many researchers tried to obtain it. Fluorine was eventually isolated in 1886 by Moissan.  Argon: Lord Rayleigh and Ramsay discovered argon in 1894 by comparing the molecular weights of nitrogen prepared by liquefaction from air, and nitrogen prepared by chemical means. It was the first noble gas to be isolated. Krypton, neon, and xenon: In 1898, within a period of three weeks, Ramsay and Travers successively separated krypton, neon and xenon from liquid argon by exploiting differences in their boiling points.

20th century: Rn
In 1899, Ernest Rutherford and Robert B. Owens discovered a radioactive gas resulting from the radioactive decay of thorium; Ramsay and Robert Whytlaw-Gray subsequently isolated radon in 1910.

See also
 Nonmetal

Nonmetals
Chemistry
History of chemistry